Barbeville is a commune in the Calvados department in the Normandy region of north-western France.

The inhabitants of the commune are known as Barbevillais or Barbevillaises.

Geography
Barbeville is located in the Drône valley some 4 km west of Bayeux. Access to the commune is by the D96 road from Bayeux which passes through the heart of the commune and the village and continues west to Rubercy. The D5 from Bayeux to Le Molay-Littry forms the southern border of the commune. The D169 from Vaucelles in the north passes south down the eastern side of the commune and continues to Ranchy. The Route nationale N13 passes through the eastern arm of the commune with the nearest exit being Exit  just north of the commune. The commune is entirely farmland.

The Drôme river forms the entire eastern border of the commune as it flows north to join the Aure south-west of Commes. The Ruisseau de Cottun flows from the west of the commune to join the Drome on the eastern border. The Ruisseau de Saint-Symphorien flows along the northern border towards the east, forming parts of the border and joining the Drome at the north-eastern tip of the commune.

History
Barbeville appears as Barbeville on the 1750 Cassini Map but unusually does not appear on the 1790 version.

Administration
List of Successive Mayors

Demography
In 2017 the commune had 178 inhabitants.

Sites and monuments

The commune has two structures which are registered as historical monuments:
A Chateau (18th century)
The Church of Saint-Martin (13th century) The Church contains an Organ (19th century) that is registered as an historical object.

Other sites of interest
The Barbeville Stud was created at the end of the 19th century by Count Foy. It is a centre for the breeding of yearlings. The Barbeville prize was contested in a race for the first time at Longchamp in 1889 and it still exists.
The Chateau of Monts (19th century)
The Cambray Manor was built by Népomucène Lemercier at the end of the 18th century.

Notable people linked to the commune

Henri Gérard (1818-1903), MP for Calvados from 1881 to 1902, was mayor of Barbeville.

See also
Communes of the Calvados department

References

Communes of Calvados (department)